Turkish State Meteorological Service is the Turkish government bureau commissioned with producing the meteorological and climatic data pertaining to Turkey. It is responsible to the Ministry of Environment and Forestry.

History 
The first meteorological organizations in Turkey was Rasâdât-i Cevviwas organization that was established on November 12, 1925. In the following years, in accordance with the law No 3127, it was requested to form a single meteorological service working on a regular. On May 15, 1957, with the order No. 6967 it was attached to the Ministry of Agriculture. On January 8, 1986, the Service took its current name with the law No 3524.

External links
Official website of the Service

References 

Governmental meteorological agencies in Europe
Governmental meteorological agencies in Asia
Meteorological
Organizations based in Ankara
Ministry of Agriculture and Forestry (Turkey)